HVO may refer to:

Organizations 
Croatian Defence Council, the main military force of Croats of Bosnia and Herzegovina during the Bosnian War
Hawaiian Volcano Observatory
Health Volunteers Overseas, an American nonprofit organization
Hidden Valley Observatory, in South Dakota, United States
Hindu Volunteers' Organisation

Sports 
HC Vítkovice Ostrava, an ice hockey club in Ostrava, Czech Republic
Heritage Village Open, a former LPGA golf tournament
Hermes Volley Oostende, a volleyball team in Oostende, Belgium

Other uses 
 Hydrotreated vegetable oil, a sustainable fuel.
 Republic of Upper Volta
 Volda University College